Michael LaVern Fanning (February 2, 1953 – October 30, 2022) was an American professional football player who was a defensive tackle for ten seasons in the National Football League (NFL). He played college football for the Notre Dame Fighting Irish, earning first-team All-American honors in 1974. He started in Super Bowl XIV for the Los Angeles Rams.

College career
Fanning was born in Mount Clemens, Michigan. At the University of Notre Dame, he accounted for 164 tackles. He was a starter for the Fighting Irish at defensive tackle in 1973 and 1974, and was a 1974 first-team All-America selection by the Walter Camp Foundation, The Sporting News, Newspaper Enterprise Association, and Time. He was a second-team  selection by the Associated Press. In his years at Notre Dame, he shared the practice field with Rudy Ruettiger, whose saga was made into a Hollywood film, Rudy.

Notre Dame ranked second in the nation in total defense in 1973 and the Irish claimed the national championship with an 11–0 record. In 1974, the defense ranked first in the nation, allowing only 195.2 yards per game and were ranked sixth in the nation in the final AP poll.

NFL career
Fanning was drafted on the first round (9th selection) of the 1975 NFL Draft by the Los Angeles Rams. He was touted to be the successor to Merlin Olsen, who was entering his 14th season in 1975. As a rookie, Fanning broke his leg, and saw limited action after returning midseason. In 1976, in spot duty for Olsen, he recorded four sacks.

Fanning took over as the starter at left tackle in 1979 after an injury to Cody Jones. Fanning had eight sacks in 1979 and ten sacks in 1980. He led the Rams in sacks in the strike-shortened 1982 season with five.

Prior to the 1983 season, Fanning was traded to the Detroit Lions. He played one season with the Lions and was signed as a free agent by the Seattle Seahawks in 1984. He had seven sacks in 1984 as a pass-rush specialist for the Seahawks.

Later life
In 2009, Fanning joined the University of Tulsa athletic department, where he worked for 14 years. He initially worked with group ticket sales, before serving as the special assistant for administration and operations until his death.

Fanning died on October 30, 2022, at the age of 69.

References

1953 births
2022 deaths
People from Mount Clemens, Michigan
Sportspeople from Metro Detroit
Players of American football from Michigan
American football defensive tackles
Notre Dame Fighting Irish football players
Los Angeles Rams players
Detroit Lions players
Seattle Seahawks players
All-American college football players
University of Tulsa people